Edickson David Contreras Bracho (born 11 October 1990, in Cabimas) is a Venezuelan diver. He competed in the 3 m springboard event at the 2012 Summer Olympics.

References 

1990 births
Living people
Divers at the 2012 Summer Olympics
Olympic divers of Venezuela
Venezuelan male divers
People from Cabimas
Divers at the 2011 Pan American Games
Divers at the 2015 Pan American Games
Pan American Games competitors for Venezuela
21st-century Venezuelan people